General Elections were held in Andhra Pradesh on 11 April 2019 to elect representatives for 17th Lok Sabha. The YSRCP swept the elections, winning 22 of the 25 Lok Sabha seats in the state. TDP was reduced to just 3 seats and national parties like BJP, INC, CPI(M) and CPI were decimated winning 0 seats each.

Party wise candidates General Election 2019

Results

Results party wise

List of elected members

Assembly segments wise lead of Parties

Old Loksabha members 

Keys:

References 
 

Indian general elections in Andhra Pradesh
2010s in Andhra Pradesh
Andhra